The Abernathy Independent School District is a school district based in Abernathy, Texas (USA). The school operates three schools: Abernathy Elementary School, Abernathy Middle School, and Abernathy High School.

Finances
As of the 2010–2011 school year, the appraised valuation of property in the district was $465,786,000. The maintenance tax rate was $0.116 and the bond tax rate was $0.034 per $100 of appraised valuation.

Academic achievement
In 2011, the school district was rated "recognized" by the Texas Education Agency.  Thirty-five percent of districts in Texas in 2011 received the same rating. No state accountability ratings will be given to districts in 2012. A school district in Texas can receive one of four possible rankings from the Texas Education Agency: Exemplary (the highest possible ranking), Recognized, Academically Acceptable, and Academically Unacceptable (the lowest possible ranking).

Historical district TEA accountability ratings
2011: Recognized
2010: Recognized
2009: Recognized
2008: Recognized
2007: Academically Acceptable
2006: Academically Acceptable
2005: Academically Acceptable
2004: Academically Acceptable

Special programs

Athletics
Abernathy High School participates in the boys sports of baseball, basketball, football, and wrestling. The school participates in the girls sports of basketball and softball. Abernathy High School plays football in UIL Class 3A Division II.

See also

List of school districts in Texas
List of high schools in Texas

References

External links
Abernathy Independent School District

School districts in Hale County, Texas
School districts in Lubbock County, Texas